American Anarchist is a 2016 American documentary film written and directed by Charlie Siskel. The film centers on interviews with William Powell, author of the controversial 1971 book The Anarchist Cookbook.  The film premiered out of competition at the 73rd edition of the Venice Film Festival.

Content 
The film focuses primarily on an interview between Siskel and Powell, covering topics such as Powell's early life, what led him to write The Anarchist Cookbook, its publication and initial reception, Powell's post-book career as a teacher for emotionally disturbed children, Powell's personal life with his wife Ochan and son Colin, his renunciation of the book's contents, and the incidents where the book was found among the belongings of the perpetrators, including, but not limited to, the Columbine High School massacre, the Arapahoe High School shooting, and the 2012 Aurora, Colorado shooting, as well as a number of assassination attempts on government officials.

Reception 
On Rotten Tomatoes, the film has an approval rating of 67%, based on 12 reviews. On Metacritic it has a score of 58 out of 100 based on reviews from 5 critics, indicating "mixed or average reviews".

Matt Fagerholm writing for RogerEbert.com rated the film three out of four stars, and wrote: "American Anarchist presents us with a young man who believed he was living in the apocalypse, and whose book has gone on to have an apocalyptic effect on society."
Michael Rechtshaffen  of the Los Angeles Times wrote: "Although it occasionally feels as if the thoughtful Powell (who unexpectedly died last summer) is being forced into a repentant corner, the film remains a penetrating case study in taking ownership of one’s actions."
Ben Kenigsberg of The New York Times called it "A study in denial, American Anarchist may be illuminating for being unilluminating."

Death of William Powell 
William Powell died in July 2016, aged 66, before the release of the film.

References

External links  
 

2016 documentary films
American documentary films
Documentary films about anarchism
Documentary films about writers
Films about books
2010s English-language films
2010s American films
English-language documentary films